Oedistoma is a genus of longbill in the bird family Melanocharitidae (berrypeckers and longbills). The genus, like the family, is endemic to New Guinea. The genus contains two species, both of which are sometimes placed in the genus Toxorhamphus.

Species
 Spectacled longbill, Oedistoma iliolophus  
 Pygmy longbill, Oedistoma pygmaeum

References

 
Bird genera
Higher-level bird taxa restricted to New Guinea
Taxonomy articles created by Polbot
Endemic fauna of New Guinea